Krishnagiri division is a revenue division in the Krishnagiri district of Tamil Nadu, India.

References 
 

Krishnagiri district